Rangrang-guyŏk or Rangrang District is one of the 18 kuyŏk that constitute  the city of Pyongyang, North Korea.  It is located south of the Taedong River, and is bordered to the north by Songyo-guyok, to the east by the Ryokpo-guyok, and to the south by Chunghwa and Kangnam counties.

History
The Lelang Commandery was, according to the Book of Han, composed of 27 districts and had a population of over 406,748 people. Located on the Taedong River at the approximate location of modern Pyongyang, archeological evidence suggests that the seat of the commandery had been moved to this district here after the destruction of Wanggeom-seong, the old Koguryo capital at Pyongyang and is claimed to have been original seat of the lelang commandery.

During the Japanese colonial period, the area was part of Taedong County. As Pyongyang grew and annexed many former parts of Taedong County, the area was later split up Pyongyang's Dong-guyok, Kangnam-gun, and Chunghwa-gun. Rangrang-guyok was officially created as a separate district in 1959.

The district is famous for the large number of Han and Koguryo tombs which litter the area, many of which were first discovered by the Japanese in the early 1910s (see Nakrang Tombs). Japanese archaeologists Torrii Ryuzo and Imanishi Ryu, in particular, were instrumental in the tomb excavations and in identifying the Nakrang Earthen Castle in Tosong-ri as the seat of the commandery. Over 1,500 tombs in all have been located, with sixty-three alone located in just one district (Chongbaek-dong). However, North Korea claims that all tombs are in fact of the Koguryo period, as it denies the existence of the Chinese settlement of Lelang, claiming it was a Koguryo city-state, and that the thousands of Chinese artifacts merely represent the burgeoning trade that the State of Nakrang had with the Han.

Administrative divisions
Rangrang-guyok is divided into nine administrative districts known as tong, as well as nine villages ("ri"). The larger five tong (Chongbaek, Chongo, Kwanmun, Nakrang, and Tongil) are further divided in two parts for administrative purposes, which Chungsong-dong is divided into three.

References

Districts of Pyongyang